Laurent Kissiedou (born 22 December 1998) is an Ivorian footballer who currently plays as a midfielder for Memphis 901 FC in the USL Championship.

Youth Career 
While a member of Atlanta United Academy’s U-18 team in 2016, Kissiedou scored 7 goals.

Club career 
On 26 August 2017, Kissiedou made his debut for the Charleston Battery in a 1–3 loss to the Richmond Kickers.

On 18 February 2018, Kissiedou joined Atlanta United 2.

On 26 April 2021, Kissiedou joined USL Championship side Memphis 901 FC ahead of the 2021 season. In his debut season for Memphis 901 FC, Kissiedou made 30 starts, logging four goals and five assists. 

In Week 24 of the USL Championship season, Kissiedou was named the league’s Player of the Week. He scored 2 goals to help Memphis 901 FC in a 3-0 win over FC Tulsa. 

Kissiedou has appeared in the USL Championship Team of the Week several times, including Weeks 7, 24 and 28. 

On January 10, 2022, Kissiedou re-signed with Memphis 901 FC for the 2022 season.

References

External links

1998 births
Living people
Ivorian footballers
Association football midfielders
Charleston Battery players
Atlanta United 2 players
Memphis 901 FC players
USL Championship players
Soccer players from Georgia (U.S. state)
People from Divo, Ivory Coast